The H. S. Williams House, known as Lawndale, is a historic U.S home that was located at 1219 Rockledge Drive, Rockledge, Florida. Hiram Smith Williams built the house in 1880 after moving to the area in 1874 from Alabama. Williams grew citrus, founded the Brevard Telephone Company, and served as a Florida state senator. The second floor of the home, which was above the kitchen was used as a schoolroom for children, and was one of the first schools in the county.Brevard County purchased the home in 1989 and restored it. In 2012, the Preservation and Education Trust from Rockledge raised money to convert the historic home house into a museum, which opened to the public for guided tours in December 2020.

Notes

Houses in Brevard County, Florida